Kate Whoriskey (born 1970) is a freelance theatre director.

Personal life
Whoriskey grew up in Acton, Massachusetts. She majored in theater at New York University (Experimental Theater Wing) (graduating in 1992) and in 1998 she completed a post-graduate program in directing from the American Repertory Theater's (A.R.T.) Institute for Advanced Theater Training at Harvard University. Whoriskey is married to actor Daniel Breaker who has played Donkey in Shrek the Musical on Broadway.  Whoriskey and Breaker have a son, named Rory, born in 2008.

Professional career
After completing her graduate program at ART, she immediately worked on directing a play there, The Master Builder by Ibsen. She has been a visiting lecturer at Princeton University
and an associate artist at South Coast Repertory in Orange County, California.  She was briefly associated with Intiman Theatre in Seattle, in 2010 to 2011, prior to its closure due to cash flow problems.

Directing credits
A partial list of Whoriskey's directing credits is in the table below.

Sources: Internet Off-Broadway Database Internet Broadway Database American Theatre Wing

Other work
Other theatres where she has directed include:

 Theatre for a New Audience (New York), Oroonoko, 2008
 Center Stage (theater) (Baltimore, MD) (2003)
 Perseverance Theatre (Alaska) (2000)
 Actors Theatre of Louisville
 Sundance Theatre Lab at the Sundance Institute, (Park City, UT), 2005
 Richard B. Fisher Center for the Performing Arts, (Bard College, Annandale-on-Hudson, NY) (2006)
 The Eugene O'Neill Theater Center (Waterford, CT)
 Geva Theatre Center (Rochester, NY).

In her career, she has also worked with writers Nilo Cruz, Michael Ondaatje, and Saïd Sayrafiezadeh.

References

External links
 Intiman Theater website
 South Coast Repertory website
 Charlie Rose interview (about production of Ruined), July 14, 2009, 12 minute video

1970 births
Living people
People from Acton, Massachusetts
Tisch School of the Arts alumni
Institute for Advanced Theater Training, Harvard University alumni
Princeton University faculty
American theatre directors
Women theatre directors
Artistic directors